Calconiscellus is a genus of crustacean in family Trichoniscidae. One species, C. gotscheensis, is listed as vulnerable on the IUCN Red List.

Species

There are seven recognised species:

Calconiscellus bertkaui 
Calconiscellus castelmartius 
Calconiscellus gibbosus 
Calconiscellus gottscheensis  (Gottschee, now Kočevje)
Calconiscellus karawankianus  (south slope of Karawanken)
Calconiscellus malanchinii 
Calconiscellus zanerae

References

Woodlice
Taxa named by Karl Wilhelm Verhoeff
Taxonomy articles created by Polbot

nl:Calconiscellus gottscheensis